Kostas Daniilidis, Ruth Yalom Stone Professor of Computer Vision at the Computer and Information Systems Department at the  University of Pennsylvania, Philadelphia, United States, PA was named Fellow of the Institute of Electrical and Electronics Engineers (IEEE) in 2012 for contributions to visual motion analysis, omni-directional vision, and three-dimensional robot vision.

References 
2. https://www.seas.upenn.edu/directory/profile.php?ID=20

Fellow Members of the IEEE
Living people
Year of birth missing (living people)
American electrical engineers